English languages may refer to:
 Anglic languages, a group of languages that includes Old English and the languages that descended from it, like Modern English or Scots
 English dialects and the World Englishes, varieties more closely associated with Modern English, spoken both in England and throughout the world

See also 
 English language
 Fingallian
 Languages of England
 Scots language
 Yola (language)